The Hermes Ludovisi, also formerly known as Mercurio Oratore ("Mercury the Orator"), is a Hellenistic sculpture of the god Hermes in his form of Hermes Psychopompus. It is made of Italic marble and is a somewhat slick 1st-century AD Roman copy after an inferred bronze original of the 5th century BC which is traditionally attributed to the young Phidias, ca 440 BC, or alternatively called "Myronic". Its model is among the earliest sculptural representations of Hermes as beardless and youthful. It was acquired by Cardinal Ludovico Ludovisi for the Ludovisi collection and is now on show at the Palazzo Altemps.

A variant on a somewhat reduced scale, found in Anzio, is conserved in the Museo Nazionale Romano, Palazzo Massimo alle Terme. As in other free Roman-era copies, there are variations in the shaping of the soft-brimmed petasos Hermes wears and the angle of the kerykeion in his left hand.

Notes

 

Sculptures by Phidias
Ludovisi collection
Collections of the National Roman Museum
Ludovisi
Roman copies of 5th-century BC Greek sculptures
Archaeological discoveries in Italy
Nude sculptures